The 1947 William & Mary Indians football team was an American football team that represented the College of William & Mary in the Southern Conference during the 1947 college football season. In its fourth season under head coach Rube McCray, the team compiled a 9–2 record (7–1 against conference opponents), won the Southern Conference championship, was ranked No. 14 in the final AP Poll, and outscored opponents by a total of 320 to 87. The team lost to North Carolina in the regular season and to Arkansas in the 1948 Dixie Bowl on New Year's Day.

Five William & Mary players were selected by the Associated Press as first-team players on the 1947 All-Southern Conference football team: fullback Jack Cloud; end Robert Steckroth; guard Knox Ramsey; and center Tommy Thompson. Cloud broke the school's scoring record with 102 points in 1947 and was later inducted into the College Football Hall of Fame. In addition, tackle Lou Creekmur later played ten years with the Detroit Lions and was inducted into the Pro Football Hall of Fame.

The team played it home games at Cary Field in Williamsburg, Virginia.

Schedule

NFL Draft selections

References 

William and Mary
William & Mary Tribe football seasons
Southern Conference football champion seasons
William